Natasha "Mo" Hunt (born 21 March 1989) is an English rugby union player who plays scrum-half for Gloucester-Hartpury and for England. She is also a qualified teacher.

Personal life
Hunt attended Dene Magna School.

Hunt is a qualified teacher and previously trained at King Edward's School Birmingham in PE, before teaching at Sir Graham Balfour School in Stafford, also as a PE teacher. Hunt communicates with fans via the use of Twitter and her inspirations in rugby are the former England Women's captain Sue Day and Susie Appleby.

England
Hunt has represented England Under 20s, England A, England sevens as well as the England women's national rugby union team. Hunt played for England in the RBS 6 Nations as well as in the rugby 7s world tournament, winning both.

In 2014, Hunt made several appearances for England Women, helping them achieve their second world title and earning a professional contract in the process. She was named in the squad for the 2017 Women's Rugby World Cup in Ireland. She was in the starting team for the World Cup final 2017. Hunt played in the starting line up in the Women's Six Nation's Squad against Scotland, winning 80-0. The team finished the tournament as Grand Slam champions 2019.

Honours
 RBS 6 Nations Rugby Women's winner 2012
 Women's rugby 7s world tournament winner
 2014 Women's Rugby World Cup

References

External links
 

1989 births
Living people
Commonwealth Games bronze medallists for England
Commonwealth Games medallists in rugby sevens
England women's international rugby union players
England international women's rugby sevens players
English female rugby union players
Great Britain national rugby sevens team players
Olympic rugby sevens players of Great Britain
Rugby sevens players at the 2016 Summer Olympics
Rugby sevens players at the 2018 Commonwealth Games
Rugby sevens players at the 2020 Summer Olympics
Rugby union players from Gloucester
Team Bath rugby union players
Bristol Bears Women players
Medallists at the 2018 Commonwealth Games